Hardy Binguila (born 17 July 1996) is a Congolese professional footballer, who last played as a midfielder for Tirana. He has also represented Congo national team.

International career
Binguila represented the Congo U17s at the 2011 African U-17 Championship and the 2011 FIFA U-17 World Cup. In January 2014, coach Claude Leroy, invited him to be a part of the Congo squad for the 2014 African Nations Championship. The team was eliminated in the group stages after losing to Ghana, drawing with Libya and defeating Ethiopia. On 13 February, 2015 Hardy signed a contract with AJ AUXERRE, a French Ligue 2 club, for 3 years.

International goals
Scores and results list Congo's goal tally first.

Honours

Club

Tirana
 Albanian Supercup: (1) 2017

References

External links
 

Living people
Republic of the Congo footballers
Republic of the Congo international footballers
2014 African Nations Championship players
2020 African Nations Championship players
CSMD Diables Noirs players
1994 births
Place of birth missing (living people)
2015 Africa Cup of Nations players
ACNFF players
Association football midfielders
Republic of the Congo A' international footballers
Republic of the Congo expatriate sportspeople in Albania
Republic of the Congo expatriate sportspeople in France
Expatriate footballers in Albania
AJ Auxerre players
Expatriate footballers in France
KF Tirana players
2022 African Nations Championship players